Heart Songs and Love Songs (stylized as Heart Songs & Love Songs) is a studio album by Slim Whitman, released in 1962 on Imperial Records.

Track listing 
The album was issued in the United States and Canada by Imperial Records as a 12-inch long-playing record, catalog number LP 9209 (mono).

References 

1962 albums
Slim Whitman albums
Imperial Records albums